Friedrich Kark (13 August 1869 – 1939) was a German conductor who conducted the first recording of Beethoven's Fifth Symphony in 1910.

References

1869 births
1939 deaths
20th-century German conductors (music)
German male conductors (music)
20th-century German male musicians